Larry Parr may refer to:

 Larry Parr (chess player) (1946–2011), American chess player, author and editor
 Larry Parr (director), New Zealand film director and screenwriter

See also
Parr (surname)